Berti is an extinct Saharan language formerly spoken in northern Sudan, specifically in the Tagabo Hills, Darfur, and Kurdufan. Berti speakers migrated into the region with other Nilo-Saharan speakers, such as the Masalit and Daju, who were agriculturalists practicing varying degrees of animal husbandry.  They settled in two separate areas: one north of Al-Fashir, while the other had continued eastward, settling in eastern Darfur and western Kurdufan by the nineteenth century.  The two groups did not appear to share a common identity, the western group differing noticeably in its cultivation of gum arabic.  By the 1990s, Sudanese Arabic had largely replaced Berti as a native language.

References

Sources 
Petráček, Karel 1965. Die Phonetik, Phonologie und Morphologie der Berti (-Siga) Sprache in Dar Fur. Archiv Orientální, 33 : 341-366.
Petráček, Karel 1966. Die Morphologie der Berti (-Siga) Sprache in Dar Fur. Archiv Orientální, 34: 295-319.
Petráček, Karel 1967. Phonologische Systeme der zentralsaharanischen Sprachen (konsonantische Phoneme). Archiv Orientální 35: 26-51. 
Petráček, Karel 1970. Phonologische Systeme der zentralsaharanischen Sprachen (vokalische Phoneme). In: Mélanges Marcel Cohen, réunis par David Cohen. 389-396. The Hague: Mouton, 
Petráček, Karel 1987. Berti or Sagato-a (Saharan) Vocabulary. Afrika und Übersee 70, 163-193.

Darfur
Ethnic groups in Sudan
Extinct languages of Africa
Languages extinct in the 1990s